Bulletproof is the soundtrack to the 1996 action-comedy film, Bulletproof. It was released on September 3, 1996, through MCA Records and contained mainly hip hop and R&B music. The album peaked at #85 on the Billboard 200 and #23 on the Top R&B Albums and featured five charting singles "Champagne", "Where I'm From", "Where You Are", "Until The Day", and "How Could You".

Track listing
"Champagne" - 3:19 (Salt-N-Pepa)
"Plant a Seed" - 3:27 (Lost Boyz) 
"Where I'm From (Don't Fight the Clean Mix II)" - 4:13 (Passion) 
"Tha 2 of Us" - 4:05 (Don't Try To Xerox featuring Christopher Williams)
"Until the Day" - 4:47 (Nonchalant) 
"How Could You" - 5:02 (K-Ci & JoJo)
"I Wanna Know Your Name" - 4:42 (Tasha) 
"Where You Are" - 5:14 (Rahsaan Patterson) 
"Chocolate (Cuties and Condoms)" - 4:22 (Adina Howard & Cydal) 
"Tha Show" - 5:11 (Wreckx-n-Effect) 
"Tres Delinquentes (Rock Mix)" - 3:32 (Delinquent Habits & Sen Dog) 
"Reverend Black Grape (The Crystal Method Remix)" - 4:31 (Black Grape & The Crystal Method)

1996 soundtrack albums
Hip hop soundtracks
MCA Records soundtracks
Contemporary R&B soundtracks
Albums produced by Hurby Azor
Albums produced by Mickey Petralia
Albums produced by Mario Caldato Jr.
Albums produced by Carl Sturken and Evan Rogers
Action film soundtracks
Comedy film soundtracks